A Practical Guide to a Spectacular Suicide is a 2014 Scottish micro-budget dark comedy film by Graham Hughes. It centres on Tom (Graeme McGeagh), a young man who is determined to kill himself. The film was nominated for awards at the Edinburgh International Film Festival and by BAFTA Scotland in 2014.

Plot 
After a number of failed attempts at suicide, Tom comes to the conclusion that he must research and plan for a "spectacular" attempt at ending his life. Having been ordered into counselling by a judge following a previous attempt on his life, Tom meets fellow patient Eve (Annabel Logan) and acerbic therapist Dr Watson (Patrick O’Brien), as well as the grumpy Mr Neilsen (Ray Crofter), who Tom has been ordered to help as part of a community service order. As he plans for his spectacular suicide, Tom forms relationships with Eve, Dr Watson and Mr Neilsen, leading him to examine and question his motives for wanting to end his own life.

Production 
A Practical Guide to a Spectacular Suicide was shot over 12 days and cost £3,000 to make, raised through crowdfunding. It was filmed in and around Glasgow, Stirling and Ayrshire in Scotland.

Release  
The film had its world premiere at Cinequest Film Festival in 2014, followed by a UK premiere at the Edinburgh International Film Festival later that year.

References 

2010s English-language films